Events in the year 2006 in Kerala.

Incumbents 

Governors of Kerala - R.L. Bhatia

Chief ministers of Kerala - Oommen Chandy (until May), V. S. Achuthanandan (starting in May)

Events 

 January 7 – Chief Justice of India K. G. Balakrishnan inaugurates National University of Advanced Legal Studies.
 February 25 – a nun named Ancy Varghese aged 28 found dead in a well adjacent to the Bethany Monastery, Perunad, Ranni.
 March 3 – twin blasts near Kozhikode bus stand in Mavoor Road.
 April 22 – first phase of 2006 Kerala Legislative Assembly election..
 April 29 – second phase of 2006 Kerala Legislative Assembly election
 July 27 – Chikungunya outbreak detected at Alappuzha district. The state is seeing an outbreak after 30 years.
 November 14 - Salem railway division created by bifurcation of Palakkad railway division. The division reduces route km under Palakkad from 1757 kms to 578 kms and brought a significant fall in revenue.

Deaths 

 May 27 - Oduvil Unnikrishnan, 62, actor
 July 18  V. P. Sathyan, 41, football player
 October 19 - Srividya, 53, actress.

See also 

 History of Kerala
 2006 in India

References 

2000s in Kerala